In materials engineering and metallurgy, hot hardness or red hardness  (when a metal glows a dull red from the heat) corresponds to hardness of a material at high temperatures. As the temperature of material increases, hardness decreases and at some point a drastic change in hardness occurs. The hardness at this point is termed the hot or red hardness of that material. Such changes can be seen in materials such as heat treated alloys.

References

Hardness tests
Solid mechanics